Dominic Lee Tsz-king (22 January 1984) is a Hong Kong politician. He is a member of the New People's Party and a Legislative Council Member representing the New Territories North East. He is a former member of the Sham Shui Po District Council for Yau Yat Tsuen from 2015 to 2019 and the former chairman of the Liberal Party Youth Committee.

Biography
Lee was born in Hong Kong in 1984 to an upper-middle-class family. He studied at Diocesan Boys' School and the Li Po Chun United World College of Hong Kong before going abroad and graduated from Rice University in 2006 with a degree in economics. He worked as an assistant in his campus polling station for Democratic Party presidential candidate John Kerry in 2004 and later worked as an intern for Democrat Al Green in the US House of Representatives.

He joined the pro-business conservative Liberal Party in 2009 after he returned to Hong Kong. During the 2004 Hong Kong legislative election, he helped Liberal Party chairman James Tien win a seat representing New Territories East. Lee became the first chairman of the party's youth committee when it was established in 2011.

Lee is vocal about his conservative stances on the economy, immigration, and social issues. He is known for his strong words in opposition to universal retirement protection and was once criticized by an elderly woman over the topic during a legislative council public hearing, which went viral on the Internet.

In 2015, he supported the government's plan to scrap visa-free facility for Indians, defending the move as a "sacrifice to protect our borders". In 2016, he led the Alliance Demanding Repatriation of Refugees against "fake" refugees from Southeast Asia coming into Hong Kong. Moreover, he demanded quitting the United Nations Convention against Torture to block "fake" refugees from coming to Hong Kong. In May that year, he led an anti-refugee protest which drew 100 to 200 people as well as counter-protesters. Claiming that there was a refugee-led crime surge in Hong Kong and that South Asians should be locked up in internment camps, Access to Information requests from Justice Centre Hong Kong have debunked these fears as not being based upon any measurable increase in crime.

In April 2016, he led a protest in Lan Kwai Fong against the Equal Opportunities Commission's ruling of "ladies' night" being discriminatory. Lee supported bar and nightclub operators in favor of resuming ladies' night to avoid potential losses of revenue. 

In the 2011 District Council elections, Lee ran in Shek Lei Extension but was defeated by Democratic Party incumbent Leung Kwok-wah. In the 2015 District Council elections, he ran in the Yau Yat Tsuen constituency and won against League of Social Democrats candidate Dickson Chau Ka-faat, succeeding council chairman Jimmy Kwok Chun-wah as member of the Sham Shui Po District Council.

In 2016, he was nominated by the Liberal Party to run in the 2016 Hong Kong legislative election in New Territories East with the support of incumbent legislator and party honorary chairman James Tien. However, the Liberal party ticket narrowly missed out on winning the seat.

In 2018, Lee claimed that civil unions and gay marriage will “encourage” people to adopt LGBTQ lifestyles in response to Hong Kong Court of Final Appeal's ruling which stated that spousal visas may be granted to same-sex couples in civil unions.

In the 2019 District Council elections, Lee narrowly lost his District Council seat in Yau Yat Tsuen to independent barrister Lau Wai-chung by 96 votes.

While an active member of the Liberal Party, Lee ran for the 2020 primary of the New People's Party for the Legislative Council election in the New Territories East constituency. As a result, his membership with the Liberal Party was revoked by party leader Felix Chung. Later that night, Lee announced his resignation as the member of Liberal Party and  joined New People's Party and Civil Force, a district-based political coalition that was established in 2014 by Chairperson of the New People's Party, Regina Ip Lau Suk-yee. 

In March 2021, after some companies boycotted purchasing cotton from Xinjiang due to suspected human rights violations, Lee said that some leaders of Western countries and Western media had falsely understood the situation in Xinjiang and have leveled allegations without evidence.

In the 2021 Hong Kong legislative election, Lee was elected to the Legislative Council representing New Territories North East (2021 constituency) with 45.35 percent of the vote. Lee is one among five members of the New People's Party to be elected to the Legislative Council and will serve a four-year term.

References

1984 births
Living people
Rice University alumni
Hong Kong businesspeople
District councillors of Sham Shui Po District
Liberal Party (Hong Kong) politicians
New People's Party (Hong Kong) politicians
Civil Force politicians
HK LegCo Members 2022–2025
Members of the Election Committee of Hong Kong, 2021–2026
Hong Kong pro-Beijing politicians
People educated at a United World College